Beaufort County Schools is a PK–12 graded school district serving Beaufort County, North Carolina. Its 14 schools serve 7,202 students as of the 2010–2011 school year.

Student demographics
For the 2010–2011 school year, Beaufort County Schools had a total population of 7,202 students and 510.70 teachers on a (FTE) basis. This produced a student-teacher ratio of 14.10:1. That same year, out of the student total, the gender ratio was 52% male to 48% female. The demographic group makeup was: White, 51%; Black, 33%; Hispanic, 2%; American Indian, 0%; and Asian/Pacific Islander, 0% (two or more races: 3%). For the same school year, 65.59% of the students received free and reduced-cost lunches.

Governance
The primary governing body of Beaufort County Schools follows a council–manager government format with a nine-member Board of Education appointing a Superintendent to run the day-to-day operations of the system. The school system currently resides in the North Carolina State Board of Education's First District.

Board of Education
The nine members of the Board of Education are elected by districts and generally meet on the third Tuesday of each month. The current members of the board are:
 Eltha S. Booth (District 1)
 E. C. Peed (District 2)
 Barbara Boyd-Williams (District 3)
 Terry Williams (District 4, Chair)
 F. Mac Hodges (District 5)
 Teressa Banks (District 6)
 Robert Belcher (District 7)
 Carolyn Walker (District 8; Vice-Chair)
 Mike Isbell (District 9)

Superintendent
Don Phipps has been the superintendent of the system since January, 2010. He previously was an administrator with the Cumberland County Schools in Fayetteville, North Carolina.

Member schools
Beaufort County Schools has 14 schools ranging from pre-kindergarten to twelfth grade. Those eight schools are separated into four high schools, two middle schools, seven elementary schools, and one alternative school that covers grades 6–12.

High schools
 Beaufort County Early College High School (Washington)
 Beaufort County Ed Tech Center – alternative school; grades 6–12 (Washington)
 Northside High School (Pinetown)
 Southside High School (Chocowinity)
 Washington High School (Washington)

K-8 schools
 Bath Elementary School
 S.W. Snowden Elementary School

Middle schools
 Chocowinity Middle School
 P. S. Jones Middle School

Elementary schools
 Chocowinity Primary School
 Eastern Elementary School
 John Cotton Tayloe Elementary School
 John Small Elementary School
 Northeast Elementary School

Athletics
According to the North Carolina High School Athletic Association, for the 2011–2012 school year:

 Northside and Southside high schools are 1A schools in the 4 Rivers Conference.
 Washington High is a 3A school in the Coastal Conference.
 The Early College and the Ed Tech Center do not have athletic teams.

See also
List of school districts in North Carolina

References

External links
 

Education in Beaufort County, North Carolina
School districts in North Carolina